Kawant fair is a fair of Rathwa tribe of Chhota Udaipur area which is held in Kwant village immediately after Holi festival.

At the Kwant fair, tribal youths are seen dancing with drums and other musical instruments. Tribal men and women wear a bouquet of peacock feathers on their heads and use it to express their love for birds.

Time and place 
The Kwant fair is held on the fifth day after Holi at Kwant village in Chhota Udaipur district, the hometown of the Rathwa tribes, about 114 km from Vadodara.

Fair 
Numerous tribal people from twenty five different villages and from Madhya Pradesh and Rajasthan come to this fair in colorful costumes. Many people from other countries also come to this fair to enjoy the tribal culture. The Rathwa tribes are known as skilled archers.

The Rathwa tribes live in houses made of bamboo, grass-leaves and mud in a forested area surrounded by shrubs. These people paint pictures of Pithora on the walls smeared with mud and dung. Behind drawing these Pithora there is belief that by drawing these pictures God dwells in their home.

Similar paintings are painted by youngsters at the fair with white dots all over their bodies, and peacock feathers, colored bamboo hats, and ox-necked Ghughra  tied around their necks. The drums are then played and the young men dance rhythmically to impress the young women. There is a rhythmic sound that is produced while dancing. Tribals also get married in this fair which is a part of their social life.

At the fair, the tribesmen place clay idols of horses and idols of other deities at the deity's shrine outside the village. They believe that doing so makes God happy. Music and dance have a special significance in the Kwant fair. The festival scene is enlivened by various musical instruments like Jodia Pava, Dhol and Piho. They look different because of their colorful clothes and beautiful ornaments at the fair. The Kwant Fair is a fair that preserves tribal culture.

References 

Chhota Udaipur district
Festivals in Gujarat